The United Regions Organization / Forum of Regional Governments and Global Associations of Regions (ORU Fogar) is an international organization, which aims to bring together regions from all over the world and represents them before other international organizations in order to boost a global policy of balanced development and territorial cohesion.

The Organization's main objective is to seek the regions' recognition as major players in global governance. ORU Fogar defends that states' decentralization power towards other actors accelerates development; consequently fostering democracy by the proximity between these new actors and the citizens. ORU Fogar promotes a model based on a strong regional government, with legally recognized capabilities and competences and also budgets in compliance with those competences. Amongst its members, ORU Fogar has important European and Latin American regions, as well as regional governments from Africa and Asia.

The organization acts according to two approaches:
 An integrated approach generated in the territories to design and implement in the field solutions to the new challenges that these territories are facing.
 The promotion of new governance rules at a global level, including the regional scale, allowing the development of this territorial approach.

Objectives 
ORU Fogar's founding objectives can be wrapped up into three main topics: To raise the voice of regions before all of the international bodies, through the association of regions from all over the world in order to work together for development; to defend a new global governance where regions have a relevant role in encouraging the participation of regional governments in the creation of new policies and work for regions in order for national governments to take into account the regional dimensión and cultural diversity, through the promotion of competitiveness and regional growth, but always trying to follow a sustainable development and respect for climate approach.

History 

Facing the new global situation, regions gathered to achieve a coordinated response to the current challenges in a worldwide association. That meeting was named "Forum of Regional Governments and Global Associations of Regions (FOGAR)", held in Cape Town, South Africa, in August 2007. It was conducted on the basis of the "Declaration of the Regions on their participation in the governance of globalization" signed in Marseille, PACA, France, on the occasion of the first international convention for a regional approach to development. Seventeen networks of regions from all continents were the founders of the Organization, with a representation of more than 900 subnational governments. Since July 2010, membership in ORU Fogar is also opened to regions and federated states individually.

Founders

Structure

General Assembly 

The General Assembly is the body of the Organization with the highest level of decision-making power. It is in charge of defining the approaches of the Organization as well as deciding over the actions that will have to be carried on. All the members of the Organization shall meet up in ordinary session once a year.

Executive Bureau 
The Executive Bureau is devoted to direct and manage the actions of the Organization, always being backed by the General Secretariat. The Executive Bureau meets up twice a year.

Some of the basic functions of the Bureau are: To propose the Organization's political vias and to carry them out, coordinate the work among the different members and commissions that can be created from such members, to supervise the General Secretariat's work and the financial management, and to establish the internal regulations which would be passed at the General Assembly.

Presidency 
President: Abdessamad Sekkal, President of the Rabat-Salé-Kénitra regional council (Morocco), was elected as ORU Fogar's President at the General Assembly held in Quito (Ecuador) on 16 October 2016. He represents the United Regions Organization and is in charge of calling the General Assembly and the Bureau's meetings.

Vice President: Laurent Wauquiez, President of the Auvergne-Rhône-Alpes regional council (France) and Vice President of the International Association of Francophone Regions (ARF) was elected as 2nd Vice President of ORU Fogar at the General Assembly held in Quito (Ecuador) on 16 October 2016. He represents the Organization in the absence of the President.

Secretary General: Carles Llorens Vila was appointed as Secretary General of ORU at the VI Summit of Regional Governments on 1 September 2014.

Presidencies to date

References

External links 
 Official webpage
 Official YouTube channel

2007 establishments in Spain
International political organizations
Regionalism (politics)
Decentralization